The Busan Lotte Town Tower, also known as Busan Lotte World Tower (Hangul: 부산 롯데 타운 타워) is a 108-floor,  supertall skyscraper on hold in Busan, South Korea. The tower is planned on a site next to Nampo-dong station on Busan Subway Line 1 .

The tower is the centerpiece of the new Busan Lotte Town and construction is being carried out in four phases. The first phase includes a department store, completed in 2009. During the second phase, an addition to the department store was completed in 2010. The third phase will be a market and a cinema, which was completed in 2014, and the last phase will include a luxury hotel, an observation deck, offices, and cultural facilities in a 107-story skyscraper. The design of the skyscraper is intended to resemble a standing ship, in reference to the city's harbour. The tower's underground parking space will be able to house over 2,400 cars. The tower will contain retail outlets (floors 1–11), offices (12-36), residences (41-78), a luxury hotel (82-104), and public access floors (107-110) with an observation deck.

In September 2013, the construction work was stopped due to the lack of funding. Construction will be resumed once the developer provides the required payments for the project. It is estimated that construction will restart in 2022.

Floor Plans

Gallery

See also
 Lotte World
 Lotte World Tower
 List of buildings with 100 floors or more

References

External links
 Emporis.com
 Skyscraperpage.com

Towers in South Korea
Lotte Corporation
Buildings and structures in Busan
Buildings and structures under construction in South Korea
Skyscrapers in Busan
Skidmore, Owings & Merrill buildings
Tourist attractions in Busan